"Billie Eilish" is a song by American rapper Armani White. It was released as a single on May 23, 2022 by Legendbound and Def Jam Recordings, and debuted at number 99 on the US Billboard Hot 100 in September 2022. The song samples "Nothin'" by N.O.R.E.

Charts

Weekly charts

Year-end charts

Certifications

References

2022 singles
2022 songs
Songs written by Pharrell Williams
Songs written by Greg Camp
Cultural depictions of American women